Maurice Robion du Pont (born 15 May 1868, date of death unknown) was a French sports shooter. He competed in three events at the 1908 Summer Olympics.

References

1868 births
Year of death missing
French male sport shooters
Olympic shooters of France
Shooters at the 1908 Summer Olympics
Place of birth missing